Choibalsan may refer to:

Khorloogiin Choibalsan, a former communist leader in Mongolia
Choibalsan (city), a city in eastern Mongolia
Choibalsan Airport, the airport of Choibalsan (city)
Choibalsan (sum), Dornod, a sum (district) in Dornod province in Mongolia